Wittmackanthus is a monotypic genus of flowering plants in the family Rubiaceae. The genus contains only one species, Wittmackanthus stanleyanus, which is found in Panama, Colombia, Ecuador, Peru and Guyana. 

The genus has one known synonym of Pallasia Klotzsch
The genus name of Wittmackanthus is in honour of Ludwig Wittmack (1839–1929), a German botanist. The specific epithet honors the British Colonial Secretary, Lord Stanley.
Both the genus and the species were described and published by Carl Ernst Otto Kuntze in Revis. Gen. Pl. Vol.1 on page 302 in 1891.

References

External links
 Wittmackanthus in the World Checklist of Rubiaceae

Monotypic Rubiaceae genera
Dialypetalantheae
Plants described in 1891
Flora of Guyana
Flora of Panama
Flora of Colombia
Flora of Ecuador
Flora of Peru